Pinguin, Löwe & Co. is a German television series.

See also
List of German television series

External links
 

2006 German television series debuts
2007 German television series endings
Television series about mammals
Television shows set in Münster
German-language television shows
Das Erste original programming